So We Can Remember is the fourth studio album by Australian hip hop group Thundamentals, released through Obese Records on 2 May 2014. It peaked at No. 3 on the ARIA Albums Chart. It produced five singles and one promotional single, "Noodle Soup".

At the J Awards of 2014, the album was nominated for Australian Album of the Year.

Chart performance

The album debuted at number 3 on the Australian album charts, and spent another four weeks in the charts. It also debuted at number 1 on the ARIA urban charts.

Track listing

Charts

References

2014 albums
Thundamentals albums